Natasha Mack (born November 3, 1997) is an American basketball player who is currently a free agent. She played for Oklahoma State University and Angelina College in her native Lufkin, Texas before being drafted by the Sky in the 2021 WNBA draft.

Early life 
Mack was born in Lufkin, Texas. She played for Lufkin High School's basketball team. She was ranked as a four-star prospect after high school and was recruited to play at the University of Houston. However, she left the university shortly afterwards, after feeling burnout, a lack of fit with the team, and tensions at home. She returned to Lufkin and worked at a poultry plant, "shearing the wings off of chicken."

College career 
A year after graduating from high school and leaving Houston, Mack was recruited by Randy McKelvey, an assistant basketball coach at Angelina College, a local community college in Lufkin. She was initially reluctant to return to basketball, but agreed to do so a few days later. She was selected to a junior-college all-star event after her first season and was named a junior-college All-American and won the NJCAA Player of the Year Award after her sophomore season.

After he senior season, she was selected to the Big-12 All-Defensive Team First-Team and was named Big 12 Defensive Player of the Year and WBCA Defensive Player of the Year.

College Statistics

Source

WNBA

Chicago Sky (2021)
Mack was drafted in the second round of the 2021 WNBA draft by the Chicago Sky. She was waived by the Sky on May 13, 2021, but was re-signed by the team shortly afterwards on May 18. Mack went back and forth with signing Hardship Contracts with the Sky until ultimately being let go for the last time in June 2021.

Minnesota Lynx (2021)
Mack signed a 7-Day contract with the Lynx on July 6, 2021.

WNBA career statistics

Regular season

|-
| align="left" | 2021
| align="left" | Chicago
| 3 || 0 || 5.3 || .667 || .000 || 1.000 || 1.3 || 0.0 || 0.0 || 0.0 || 0.7 || 2.0
|-
| align="left" | 2021
| align="left" | Minnesota
| 1 || 0 || 2.0 || .000 || .000 || .000 || 0.0 || 0.0 || 0.0 || 0.0 || 0.0 || 0.0
|-
| align="left" | Career
| align="left" | 1 year, 2 teams
| 4 || 0 || 4.5 || .667 || .000 || 1.000 || 1.0 || 0.0 || 0.0 || 0.0 || 0.5 || 1.5

References

External links 

 WNBA draft profile
 Oklahoma State player profile

1997 births
Living people
American women's basketball players
Angelina College alumni
Basketball players from Texas
Chicago Sky draft picks
Chicago Sky players
Minnesota Lynx players
Forwards (basketball)
Junior college women's basketball players in the United States
Oklahoma State Cowgirls basketball players